Slaughtercult is the second full-length studio album by American death metal band Exhumed. It contained backup vocals from Henke Forss from Dawn and guest lead guitars on one song by Mieszko Talarczyk of Nasum.

Overview
Founding member Matt Harvey said that Slaughtercult was "the album where we came closest to achieving our goal – just a brutal, simple, direct group of songs that were very up-front and live sounding." He further noted the band's pride over the lack of double bass on the album, in contrast to contemporary death metal trends. Slaughtercult also reduced the quantity of sound effects and samples in comparison to Gore Metal; Harvey attributed this to the departure of Ross Sewage, who had taken a leading role in the implementation of these sound elements in the past. Harvey said, "We didn't feel like they [the sound effects and samples] fit in with the overall direction of the material and the feel of the album and we just wanted to make something 100% over-the-top and in-your-face."

In support of Slaughtercult, the band toured the US three times, and embarked on their first proper European tour, including co-headlining festivals like Fuck the Commerce and Obscene Extreme. The band also appeared at the Wacken Open Air festival.

Track listing
All songs written by Matt Harvey, except where noted.

Personnel

Exhumed
Matt Harvey – guitars, bass, vocals
Col Jones – drums
Mike Beams – guitars, vocals

Guest musicians
Mieszko Talarczyk – lead guitar ("Fester Forever"), engineering, mixing, mastering
Juan Urteaga – additional vocals
Leon del Müerte – additional vocals
Sean McGrath – additional vocals
Henke Forss – additional vocals
Jason Balsells – additional vocals

Production
Jonathan Canady – design
Julio Sánchez – photography
Juan Urteaga – assistant engineering
Matthew F. Jacobson – executive production

References

Exhumed (band) albums
2000 albums
Relapse Records albums